The 2017 Jacksonville Dolphins football team represented Jacksonville University in the 2017 NCAA Division I FCS football season. They were led by second-year head coach Ian Shields and played their home games at D. B. Milne Field. They were members of the Pioneer Football League (PFL). They finished the season 7–4, 5–3 in PFL play to finish in a three-way tie for third place.

Schedule

Source: Schedule

Game summaries

at Mercer

Walsh

at Marist

Guilford

Davidson

at Butler

San Diego

at Campbell

Valparaiso

Stetson

at Drake

References

Jacksonville
Jacksonville Dolphins football seasons
Jacksonville Dolphins football